Eucalyptus sargentii, commonly known as Salt River gum, is a species of mallet, mallee or small tree that is endemic to Western Australia. It has rough bark on part or all of the trunk, smooth bark above, linear to narrow lance-shaped leaves, flower buds in groups of seven, whitish to creamy yellow flowers and conical fruit.

Description
Eucalyptus sargentii is a tree or a mallee that typically grows to a height of  but does not usually form a lignotuber (a mallet). It has smooth greenish bark that is brownish when new, usually with rough, greyish flaky bark on part or all of the trunk. Flowering occurs from August or October to December or January and the flowers are whitish to creamy yellow.

Taxonomy and naming
Eucalyptus sargentii was first formally described in 1924 by Joseph Maiden in his book A Critical Revision of the Genus Eucalyptus. The specific epithet honours Oswald Hewlett Sargent, a pharmacist and naturalist from York.

In 1992, Lawrie Johnson and Ken Hill described E. sargentii subsp. fallens and E. sargentii subsp. sargentii but only the autonym is accepted by the Australian Plant Census (APC). In 2005, Dean Nicolle described E. sargentii subsp. onesis and the name is accepted by the APC. Subspecies onesis differs from the autonym in having a lignotuber and a dense, spreading mallee habit. The name onesis is from an ancient Greek word meaning "advantage" or "use", referring to the potential use of this subspecies in reclaiming saline sites.

Distribution and habitat
Salt River gum grows in open woodland in low-lying, poorly drained areas near salt lakes and salt creeks. It has a scattered distribution from Pithara to Lake Grace in the Avon Wheatbelt biogeographic region. Subspecies onesis is restricted to seven populations between Piawaning, York and Cunderdin.

Conservation status
Subspecies sargenti is classified as "not threatened" by the Western Australian Government Department of Parks and Wildlife, but subspecies onesis is classified as "Priority Three" by the Government of Western Australia Department of Parks and Wildlife meaning that it is poorly known and known from only a few locations but is not under imminent threat.

See also
List of Eucalyptus species

References

Eucalypts of Western Australia
Trees of Australia
sargentii
Myrtales of Australia
Plants described in 1924
Taxa named by Joseph Maiden